Al-Balad ("The City"), is the 90th Surah or chapter of the Qur'an. It is composed of 20 ayat (verses).

Summary
1-7 Man, though created in misery, yet boasts of his riches
8-16 Captives to be freed and the poor and orphan to be fed
17-20 Description of the companions of the right and left hand

Period of revelation
The subject matter and style  of  Qur'anic chapter al balad resemble those of the earliest Surahs revealed at Mecca, but it contains a pointer which indicates that it was sent down in the period when the disbelievers of Makkah had resolved to oppose Muhammad, and made it lawful for themselves to commit tyranny and excess against him.

Theme and subject matter
According to an interpretation expounded on in the tafsīr (commentary) written by Sayyid Abul Ala Maududi (d. 1979) entitled Tafhim al-Qur'an,
Its theme is to explain the true position of man in the world and of the world in relation to man and to tell that God has shown to man both the highways of good and evil, has also provided for him the means to judge and see and follow them, and now it rests upon mans own effort and judgment whether he chooses the path of virtue and reaches felicity or adopts the path of vice and meets with doom.

First, the city of Makkah and the hardships being faced therein by Muhammad and the state of the children of Adam have been cited as a witness to the truth that this world is not a place of rest and ease for man, where he might have been born to enjoy life, but here he has been created into toil and struggle. If this theme is read with verse 39 of Surah An-Najm (Laisa lil insani illa ma saa: there is nothing for man but what he has striven for), it becomes plain that in this world the future of man depends on his toil and struggle, effort and striving.

After this, man's misunderstanding that he is all in all in this world and that there is no superior power to watch what he does and to call him to account, has been refuted.

Then, taking one of the many moral concepts of ignorance held by man, as an example, it has been pointed out what wrong criteria of merit and greatness he has proposed for himself in the world. The person who for ostentation and display squanders heaps of wealth, not only himself prides upon his extravagances but the people also admire him for it enthusiastically, whereas the Being Who is watching over his deeds, sees by what methods he obtained the wealth and in what ways and with what motives and intention he spent it.

Then Allah says: We have given man the means of knowledge and the faculties of thinking and understanding and opened up before him both the highways of virtue and vice: one way leads down to moral depravity, and it is an easy way pleasing for the self; the other way leads up to moral heights, which is steep like an uphill road, for scaling which man has to exercise self- restraint. It is man's weakness that he prefers slipping down into the abyss to scaling the cliff.

Then, Allah has explained what the steep road is by following which man can ascend to the heights. It is that he should give up spending for ostentation, display and pride and should spend his wealth to help the orphans and the needy, should believe in Allah and His Religion and joining the company of believers should participate in the construction of a society which should fulfill the demands of virtue and righteousness patiently and should be compassionate to the people. The end of those who follow this way is that they would become worthy of Allah's mercies. On the contrary, the end of those who follow the wrong way, is the fire of Hell from which there is no escape.

Sayyid Qutb (d. 1966), who was an Egyptian author, Islamist, and leading intellectual of the Egyptian Muslim Brotherhood, summarised the overall theme of Surat Al-Lail in the introduction to his extensive Quranic commentary, Fi Zilal al-Qur'an (In the shades of the Qur'an) by saying:

References

External links

Quran 90 Clear Quran translation

Afterlife
Islamic eschatology
Balad
Culture in Mecca